The Kansas City Chiefs are a professional American football team based in Kansas City, Missouri. The Chiefs compete in the National Football League (NFL) as a member club of the league's American Football Conference (AFC) West division.

The team was founded in 1959 as the Dallas Texans by businessman Lamar Hunt, and was a charter member of the American Football League (AFL). In spring 1963, the team relocated to Kansas City, and assumed its current name. Hunt's son, Clark Hunt, serves as chairman and CEO. While the elder Hunt's ownership stakes passed to his widow and children after his death in 2006, Clark is the operating head of the franchise; he represents the Chiefs at all league meetings, and has ultimate authority on personnel changes.

The Chiefs won three AFL championships, in 1962, 1966, and 1969, and were the second AFL team (after the New York Jets) to defeat an NFL team in an AFL–NFL World Championship Game, when they defeated the Minnesota Vikings in Super Bowl IV. That victory on January 11, 1970, was the final game before the leagues' merger went into full effect. The Chiefs were also the second team, after the Green Bay Packers (whom they played in Super Bowl I), to appear in more than one Super Bowl (and the first AFL team to do so) as well as the first to appear in the championship game in two different decades. Despite post-season success early in the franchise's history, winning five of their first six postseason games, the team struggled to find success in the playoffs for decades, including losing ten of eleven playoff games from 1993 to 2017, which included an eight-game losing streak. Since then, the Chiefs have risen to dominance under head coach Andy Reid and quarterback Patrick Mahomes, appearing in three Super Bowls since 2019 and winning two, LIV and LVII.

Franchise history

American Football League
In 1959, Lamar Hunt began discussions with other businessmen to establish a professional football league that would rival the National Football League. Hunt's desire to secure a football team was heightened after watching the 1958 NFL Championship Game between the New York Giants and Baltimore Colts. After unsuccessful attempts to purchase and relocate the NFL's Chicago Cardinals to his hometown of Dallas, Texas, Hunt went to the NFL and asked to create an expansion franchise in Dallas. The NFL turned him down, so Hunt then established the American Football League and started his own team, the Dallas Texans, to begin play in 1960.

Hunt hired a little-known assistant coach from the University of Miami football team, Hank Stram, to be the team's head coach after the job offer was declined by Bud Wilkinson and Tom Landry. After Stram was hired, Don Klosterman was hired as head scout, and was credited by many for bringing a wealth of talent to the Texans after luring it away from the NFL, often hiding players and using creative means to land them.

The Texans shared the Cotton Bowl with the NFL's Dallas Cowboys for three seasons. The Texans were to have exclusive access to the stadium until the NFL put an expansion team, the Dallas Cowboys, there. While the team averaged a league-best 24,500 at the Cotton Bowl, the Texans gained less attention due to the AFL's relatively lower profile compared to the NFL's. In the franchise's first two seasons, the team managed only an 8–6 and 6–8 record, respectively.

In their third season, the Texans strolled to an 11–3 record and a berth in the team's first American Football League Championship Game, against the Houston Oilers. The game was broadcast nationally on ABC and the Texans defeated the Oilers 20–17 in double overtime. The game lasted 77 minutes and 54 seconds, which still stands as the longest championship game in professional football history.

It turned out to be the last game the team would play as the Dallas Texans. Despite competing against a Cowboys team that managed only a 9–28–3 record in their first three seasons, Hunt decided that the Dallas–Fort Worth media market could not sustain two professional football franchises. He considered moving the Texans to either Atlanta or Miami for the 1963 season. He was ultimately swayed by an offer from Kansas City Mayor Harold Roe Bartle. Bartle promised to triple the franchise's season ticket sales and expand the seating capacity of Municipal Stadium to accommodate the team.

Hunt agreed to relocate the franchise to Kansas City on May 22, 1963, and on May 26, the team was renamed the Kansas City Chiefs. Hunt and head coach Hank Stram initially planned to retain the Texans name, but a fan contest determined the new "Chiefs" name in honor of Mayor Bartle's nickname that he acquired in his professional role as Scout Executive of the St. Joseph and Kansas City Boy Scout Councils, and founder of the Scouting Society, the Tribe of Mic-O-Say.  Despite the historical use of Native American features, it has been acknowledged that the team's naming was not a direct reference to Native Americans but only to Bartle's nickname "Chief". Business Insider journalist Meredith Cash even stated in January 2020 that Bartle "insisted on the team being named after himself" and that "Bartle was known as Chief Lone Bear within Mic-O-Say circles, and eventually the nickname "Chief" caught on among people throughout Kansas City."

The franchise became one of the strongest teams in the now thriving American Football League, with the most playoff appearances for an AFL team (tied with the Oakland Raiders), and the most AFL Championships (3). The team's dominance helped Lamar Hunt become a central figure in negotiations with NFL Commissioner Pete Rozelle to agree on an AFL–NFL merger. In the meetings between the two leagues, a merged league championship game was agreed to be played in January 1967 following the conclusion of the leagues' respective 1966 seasons. Hunt insisted on calling the game the "Super Bowl" after seeing his children playing with a popular toy at the time, a Super Ball. While the first few games were designated the "AFL–NFL World Championship Game", the Super Bowl name became its officially licensed title in years to come.

The Chiefs cruised to an 11–2–1 record in 1966, and defeated the defending AFL Champion Buffalo Bills in the AFL Championship Game. The Chiefs were invited to play the NFL's league champion Green Bay Packers in the first AFL–NFL World Championship Game. Kansas City and Green Bay played a close game for the first half, but Green Bay took control in the final two quarters, winning the game by a score of 35–10. The Chiefs lost the game but gained the respect of several Packers opponents following the game. The Chiefs' inter-league match-up with the Packers was not the last time that they would face an NFL opponent, especially on the championship stage. The following August, Kansas City hosted the NFL's Chicago Bears in the 1967 preseason and won the game 66–24.

Despite losing to the division rival Oakland Raiders twice in the regular season in 1969, the two teams met for a third time in the AFL Championship Game, where Kansas City won 17–7. Backup quarterback Mike Livingston led the team in a six-game winning streak after Len Dawson suffered a leg injury which kept him out of most of the season's games.

While getting plenty of help from the club's defense, Dawson returned from the injury and led the Chiefs to Super Bowl IV. Dawson was named the game's Most Valuable Player after completing 12-of-17 passes for 142 yards and one touchdown, with 1 interception. The following season, the Chiefs and the rest of the American Football League merged with the National Football League after the AFL–NFL merger became official. The Chiefs were placed in the American Football Conference's West Division.

From 1960 to 1969, the Chiefs/Texans won 87 games, which is the most in the ten-year history of the AFL.

Hank Stram leaves team
In 1970, the Chiefs won only seven games in their first season in the NFL and missed the playoffs. The following season, the Chiefs tallied a 10–3–1 record and won the AFC West Division. Head coach Hank Stram considered his 1971 Chiefs team as his best, but they failed to capture their championship dominance from 1969. Most of the pieces of the team which won Super Bowl IV two years earlier were still in place for the 1971 season. The Chiefs tied with the Miami Dolphins for the best record in the AFC, and both teams met in a Christmas Day playoff game which the Chiefs lost 27–24 in double overtime. The Dolphins outlasted the Chiefs with a 37-yard field goal. The game surpassed the 1962 AFL Championship Game as the longest ever at 82 minutes and 40 seconds. The game was also the final football game at Kansas City's Municipal Stadium.

In 1972, the Chiefs moved into the newly constructed Arrowhead Stadium at the Truman Sports Complex outside of Downtown Kansas City. The team's first game at Arrowhead was against the St. Louis Cardinals, a preseason game which the Chiefs won 24–14. Linebacker Willie Lanier and quarterback Len Dawson won the NFL Man of the Year Award in 1972 and 1973, respectively.

The Chiefs would not return to the post-season for the remainder of the 1970s, and the 1973 season was the team's last winning season for seven years. Hank Stram was fired following a 5–9 season in 1974, and many of the Chiefs' future Hall of Fame players would depart by the middle of the decade. From 1975 to 1988, the Chiefs had become a team that rarely won which provided Chiefs fans with nothing but futility. Five head coaches struggled to achieve the same success as Stram, compiling an 81–121–1 record.

In 1980, Coach Marv Levy cut future Hall of Fame Kicker Jan Stenerud for little-known Nick Lowery, who would become the most accurate kicker in NFL History over the next fourteen years. In 1981, running back Joe Delaney rushed for 1,121 yards and was named the AFC Rookie of the Year. The Chiefs finished the season with a 9–7 record and entered the 1982 season with optimism. The NFL Players Association strike curbed the Chiefs' chances of returning to the postseason for the first time in over a decade. The Chiefs tallied a 3–6 record and in the off-season, Joe Delaney died while trying to save several children from drowning in a pond near his home in Louisiana.

The Chiefs drafted quarterback Todd Blackledge over future greats such as Jim Kelly and Dan Marino in the 1983 NFL Draft. Blackledge never started a full season for Kansas City while Kelly and Marino played Hall of Fame careers. While the Chiefs struggled on offense in the 1980s, the Chiefs had a strong defensive unit consisting of Pro Bowlers such as Bill Maas, Albert Lewis, Art Still and Deron Cherry.

John Mackovic took over head coaching duties for the 1983 season after Marv Levy was fired. Over the next four seasons, Mackovic coached the Chiefs to a 30–34 record, but took the team to its first postseason appearance in 15 years in the 1986 NFL playoffs. They lost to the New York Jets in the wild-card round. Despite leading the Chiefs to only their third winning season and second playoff appearance since the merger, Mackovic was fired for what Hunt described as a lack of chemistry. Frank Gansz served as head coach for the next two seasons, but won only eight of 31 games.

Marty Schottenheimer era (1989–1998)

On December 19, 1988, owner Lamar Hunt hired Carl Peterson as the team's new president, general manager, and chief executive officer. Peterson fired head coach Frank Gansz two weeks after taking over and hired Marty Schottenheimer as the club's seventh head coach. In the 1988 and 1989 NFL Drafts, the Chiefs selected both defensive end Neil Smith and linebacker Derrick Thomas, respectively. The defense that Thomas and Smith anchored in their seven seasons together was a big reason why the Chiefs reached the postseason in six straight years.

In Schottenheimer's ten-season tenure as head coach, the Chiefs became a perennial playoff contender, featuring offensive players including Steve DeBerg, Christian Okoye, Stephone Paige and Barry Word, a strong defense, anchored by Thomas, Smith, Albert Lewis and Deron Cherry, and on special teams, Nick Lowery, who was then the most accurate kicker in NFL History. The team recorded a 101–58–1 record, and clinched seven playoff berths. The Chiefs' 1993 season was the franchise's most successful in 22 years. With newly acquired quarterback Joe Montana and running back Marcus Allen, two former Super Bowl champions and MVPs, the Chiefs further strengthened their position in the NFL. The 11–5 Chiefs defeated the Pittsburgh Steelers and Houston Oilers on their way to the franchise's first AFC Championship Game appearance against the Buffalo Bills. The Chiefs were overwhelmed by the Bills and lost the game by a score of 30–13. The Chiefs' victory on January 16, 1994, against the Oilers remained the franchise's last post-season victory for 22 years until their 30–0 victory over the Houston Texans on January 9, 2016.

In the 1995 NFL playoffs, the 13–3 Chiefs hosted the Indianapolis Colts in a cold, damp late afternoon game at Arrowhead Stadium. Kansas City lost the game 10–7 against the underdog Colts, after kicker Lin Elliot missed three field-goal attempts and quarterback Steve Bono threw three interceptions. The Chiefs selected tight end Tony Gonzalez with the 13th overall selection in the 1997 NFL Draft, a move which some considered to be a gamble being that Gonzalez was primarily a basketball player at California. During a 1997 season full of injuries to starting quarterback Elvis Grbac, backup quarterback Rich Gannon took the reins of the Chiefs' offense as the team headed to another 13–3 season. Head coach Marty Schottenheimer chose Grbac to start the playoff game against the Denver Broncos despite Gannon's successes in previous weeks. Grbac's production in the game was lacking, and the Chiefs lost to the Broncos 14–10. Denver went on to capture their fifth AFC Championship by defeating Pittsburgh, and then defeated the Green Bay Packers in Super Bowl XXXII. Coach Schottenheimer announced his resignation from the Chiefs following the 1998 season.

Following Schottenheimer's resignation, defensive coordinator Gunther Cunningham took over coaching duties for the next two seasons, compiling a 16–16 record. By the end of the Chiefs' decade of regular-season dominance, Gannon had signed with the Oakland Raiders, Neil Smith signed with the Denver Broncos, and Derrick Thomas was paralyzed from a car accident on January 23, 2000. Thomas died from complications of his injury weeks later. After allegedly reading online that he would be relieved of duties, head coach Gunther Cunningham was fired.

Dick Vermeil years (2001–2005)
Looking to change the Chiefs' game plan which relied on a tough defensive strategy for the past decade, Carl Peterson contacted Dick Vermeil about the Chiefs' head coaching vacancy for the 2001 season. Vermeil previously led the St. Louis Rams to a victory in Super Bowl XXXIV. Vermeil was hired on January 12. The Chiefs then traded a first-round draft pick in the 2001 NFL Draft to St. Louis for quarterback Trent Green and signed free agent running back Priest Holmes to be the team's cornerstones on offense.

In 2003, Kansas City began the season with nine consecutive victories, a franchise record. They finished the season with a 13–3 record and the team's offense led the NFL in several categories under the direction of USA Today's Offensive Coach of the Year honoree, Al Saunders. Running back Priest Holmes surpassed Marshall Faulk's single-season touchdown record by scoring his 27th rushing touchdown against the Chicago Bears in the team's regular-season finale. The team clinched the second seed in the 2004 NFL playoffs and hosted the Indianapolis Colts in the AFC Divisional Playoffs. In a game where neither team punted, the Chiefs lost the shoot-out 38–31. It was the third time in nine seasons that the Chiefs went 8–0 at home in the regular season, only to lose their post-season opener at Arrowhead.

After a disappointing 7–9 record in 2004, the 2005 Chiefs finished with a 10–6 record but no playoff berth. They were the fourth team since 1990 to miss the playoffs with a 10–6 record. Running back Larry Johnson started in place of the injured Priest Holmes and rushed for 1,750 yards in only nine starts. Prior to the Chiefs' final game of the season, head coach Dick Vermeil announced his retirement. The Chiefs won the game 37–3 over the playoff-bound Cincinnati Bengals.

Decline
Within two weeks of Vermeil's retirement, the Chiefs returned to their defensive roots with the selection of its next head coach. The team introduced Herm Edwards, a former Chiefs scout and head coach of the New York Jets, as the team's tenth head coach after trading a fourth-round selection in the 2006 NFL Draft to the Jets. Quarterback Trent Green suffered a severe concussion in the team's season opener to the Cincinnati Bengals which left him out of play for eight weeks. Backup quarterback Damon Huard took over in Green's absence and led the Chiefs to a 5–3 record.

Kansas City was awarded a Thanksgiving Day game against the Denver Broncos in response to owner Lamar Hunt's lobbying for a third Thanksgiving Day game. The Chiefs defeated the Broncos 19–10 in the first Thanksgiving Day game in Kansas City since 1969. Hunt was hospitalized at the time of the game and died weeks later on December 13 due to complications with prostate cancer. The Chiefs honored their owner for the remainder of the season, as did the rest of the league.

Trent Green returned in the middle of the season, but struggled in the final stretch, and running back Larry Johnson set an NFL record with 416 carries in a season. Kansas City managed to clinch their first playoff berth in three seasons with a 9–7 record and a bizarre sequence of six losses from other AFC teams on New Year's Eve, culminating with a Broncos loss to the 49ers. The Indianapolis Colts hosted the Chiefs in the Wild Card playoffs and defeated Kansas City 23–8.

In 2007, Trent Green was traded to the Miami Dolphins leaving the door open for either Damon Huard or Brodie Croyle to become the new starting quarterback. After starting the season with a 4–3 record, the Chiefs lost the remaining nine games when running back Larry Johnson suffered a season-ending foot injury and the quarterback position lacked stability with Huard and Croyle. Despite the team's 4–12 record, tight end Tony Gonzalez broke Shannon Sharpe's NFL record for touchdowns at the position (63) and defensive end Jared Allen led the NFL in quarterback sacks with 15.5.

The Chiefs began their 2008 season with the youngest team in the NFL. The starting lineup had an average of 25.5 years of age. By releasing several veteran players such as cornerback Ty Law and wide receiver Eddie Kennison and trading defensive end Jared Allen, the Chiefs began a youth movement. The Chiefs had a league-high thirteen selections in the 2008 NFL Draft and chose defensive tackle Glenn Dorsey and offensive lineman Branden Albert in the first round. Analysts quickly called Kansas City's selections as the best of the entire draft. Entering the season, the Chiefs were unsure if injury-prone quarterback Brodie Croyle, who was the incumbent starter, could be their quarterback in the long-term. Croyle was injured in the team's first game of the season and Damon Huard started in Croyle's absence. Tyler Thigpen become the third Chiefs starting quarterback in as many games for a start against the Atlanta Falcons. After a poor performance by Thigpen, in which he threw three interceptions against the Falcons defense, Huard was retained as the starting quarterback. The Chiefs struggled off the field as much as on as tight end Tony Gonzalez demanded a trade and running back Larry Johnson was involved in legal trouble.

Croyle returned for the Chiefs' game against the Tennessee Titans, but both he and Damon Huard suffered season-ending injuries in the game. The Chiefs reorganized their offense to a new spread offense game plan focused around Tyler Thigpen. The Chiefs' new offense was implemented to help Thigpen play to the best of his abilities and also following the absence of Larry Johnson, who was suspended for his off-field conduct. The Chiefs made a huge gamble by using the spread offense, as most in the NFL believe that it cannot work in professional football, and also head coach Herm Edwards was traditionally in favor of more conservative, run-oriented game plans.

The 2008 season ended with a franchise worst 2–14 record, where the team suffered historic blowout defeats nearly week-in and week-out, a 34–0 shut-out to the Carolina Panthers, and allowed a franchise-high 54 points against the Buffalo Bills. The team's general manager, chief executive officer, and team president Carl Peterson resigned at the end of the season, and former New England Patriots vice president of player personnel Scott Pioli was hired as his replacement for 2009.

On January 23, 2009, Herm Edwards was fired as head coach, and two weeks later Todd Haley signed a four-year contract to become Edwards' successor. Haley had a background with Pioli, which made him an attractive hire for Pioli's first coach in Kansas City.

In April 2009, Tony Gonzalez was traded to the Atlanta Falcons after failed trade attempts over the previous two seasons. Notably, head coach Todd Haley fired offensive coordinator Chan Gailey just weeks before the start of the 2009 season and chose to take on the coordinator duties himself. Throughout 2009 the Chiefs acquired veterans to supplement the Chiefs' young talent including Matt Cassel, Mike Vrabel, Bobby Engram, Mike Brown, Chris Chambers, and Andy Alleman. The team finished with a 4–12 record, just a two-game improvement upon their record from the 2008 season.

For the 2010 season, the Chiefs made significant hires for their coaching staff, bringing on former Patriots assistant coaches Charlie Weis and Romeo Crennel to coach the offense and defense, respectively. The coaching additions proved to be very successful, as the Chiefs would go on to secure their first AFC West title since 2003. Their ten victories in the 2010 season combined for as many as the team had won in their previous three seasons combined.

On January 9, 2011, the Chiefs lost their home Wild Card playoff game to the Baltimore Ravens 30–7. Six players were chosen for the Pro Bowl: Dwayne Bowe, Jamaal Charles, Brian Waters, Tamba Hali, Matt Cassel, and rookie safety Eric Berry. Jamaal Charles won the FEDEX ground player of the year award and Dwayne Bowe led the NFL in Touchdown Receptions.

For their first pick in the 2011 NFL draft, the team selected Jon Baldwin. After a poor start, Haley was relieved of duties as head coach on December 12. Clark Hunt made note of "bright spots at different points this season," but felt that overall the Chiefs were not progressing. The highest point of the 2011 season was an upset win against the Packers, who at that time, were undefeated with a 13–0 record. Defensive coordinator Romeo Crennel would be named the team's interim head coach for the remaining three games of the season, including the aforementioned Packers game. On January 9, 2012, Crennel was named the 11th full-time head coach in Chiefs history.

The 2012, Chiefs became the first team since the 1929 Buffalo Bisons to not lead in regulation through any of their first nine games. The Chiefs tied their franchise-worst record of 2–14 and clinched the No. 1 overall pick in the 2013 NFL Draft. It is the first time since the merger they have held the first overall pick.

Reemergence
Following the 2012 season, the Chiefs fired head coach Romeo Crennel and general manager Scott Pioli. Former Philadelphia Eagles head coach Andy Reid was brought in as head coach to work with new general manager John Dorsey, a former Green Bay Packers head scout.

The Chiefs acquired quarterback Alex Smith from the San Francisco 49ers for the Chiefs' second-round pick, 34th overall, in the 2013 draft and a conditional pick in 2014 draft. Matt Cassel was released shortly after. The Chiefs selected Eric Fisher with the first overall pick of the 2013 NFL Draft.

In 2013, the Chiefs started 9–0 for the second time in team history. They led in their wildcard game against the Indianapolis Colts 38–10 shortly after halftime, but collapsed late and lost 45–44.

In 2014, the Chiefs attempted to make the playoffs for the second straight season for the first time since 1995, finishing 9–7 and getting eliminated in Week 17.

After a promising win for the Chiefs against Houston in Week 1, Kansas City went on a five-game losing streak culminating in a 16–10 loss to Minnesota and the loss of Jamaal Charles to a torn ACL. They made one of the most improbable season comebacks in the NFL and won ten straight to improve their record from 1–5 to 11–5. The team clinched a playoff berth after a 17–13 win over Cleveland in Week 16 to become only the second post-merger NFL team to make the playoffs following a 1–5 start.

The streak achieved by the Chiefs broke a franchise record for nine straight (2003, 2013) and second nine plus game win streak under Reid. After a Week 17 win over Oakland 23–17, the Chiefs achieved their longest winning streak in franchise history at ten games. They qualified for the playoffs, playing in the 2015 AFC Wild-Card playoff game, held at NRG Stadium in Houston, Texas on January 9, 2016. The Chiefs defeated the Houston Texans 30–0 to earn their first NFL playoff win in 23 seasons, dating back to the 1993–94 NFL playoffs, a win that also came in Houston. The Chiefs' Wild-Card playoff victory ended what was at the time the third-longest drought in the NFL, and it also ended a then NFL record eight-game playoff losing streak. Riddled with injuries, they were defeated by the New England Patriots 27–20 in the AFC Divisional Round.

After facing a 24–3 deficit with six minutes left in the 3rd quarter, the Chiefs engineered a 33–27 comeback win against the San Diego Chargers ending with a two-yard touchdown run by Alex Smith in overtime to give the Chiefs their largest regular season comeback to start the season at 1–0.

On Christmas Day, the Chiefs defeated the Denver Broncos 33–10 to give Kansas City their tenth straight win against divisional opponents.

On January 1, 2017, the Chiefs clinched the AFC West and the second seed going into the playoffs that year, where they fell to the Pittsburgh Steelers 18–16 in the divisional round as Chris Boswell hit 6 field goals.

The Chiefs finished the 2017–18 season with a 10–6 record, and won the AFC West. This was the first time in Chiefs history that they won the AFC West in back-to-back years. In the Wild Card round, the Chiefs lost a tight game to the Tennessee Titans 22–21, allowing Derrick Henry to rush for 156 yards. The loss extended their NFL record for most consecutive home playoff losses to six. The game marked the end of Alex Smith's five-year tenure with the Chiefs, as he was traded to the Washington Redskins a few weeks later.

Patrick Mahomes becomes the starter
Patrick Mahomes made his NFL debut and first career start in the December 31, 2017 game against the Denver Broncos. The Chiefs won the game 27-24, with Mahomes going 22 for 35 with 284 yards and one interception. The Chiefs began the 2018 season with first-year starter Mahomes as their quarterback and finished the regular season with a record of 12–4, clinching the AFC West for the third year in a row and the AFC's top seed. This included victories over division rivals Los Angeles Chargers, Oakland Raiders and Denver Broncos (twice), along with important conference victories over the Pittsburgh Steelers, Cincinnati Bengals, and Jacksonville Jaguars. Their first loss of the season came at the hands of the New England Patriots with a last-second field goal. Their second loss of the season came against the Los Angeles Rams with a final score of 51–54, in which the Kansas City Chiefs made history by becoming the first NFL team to lose a game after scoring more than 50 points. Mahomes finished the season with 5,097 yards and 50 touchdowns, both team records. He became the 11th quarterback to throw for 5,000 yards and the 3rd to throw for 50 touchdowns. He joined Peyton Manning as only the 2nd player in NFL history to throw for 5,000 yards and 50 touchdowns. For his performance during the season, he was named AP NFL MVP, the first Chief to ever win the award.

In the AFC Divisional round on January 12, 2019, the Chiefs defeated the Indianapolis Colts 31–13 to move on to the AFC Championship Game. This marked the Chiefs' first playoff win in Arrowhead Stadium in 25 years. This also enabled the Chiefs to host the AFC Championship Game for the first time ever. The next week, Kansas City's bid for its first Super Bowl berth in 49 years ended with a 37–31 overtime loss to the New England Patriots.

The Chiefs finished the 2019 regular season with a 12–4 record, winning the AFC West division title for the fourth straight year, and clinched the AFC's second seed behind the Baltimore Ravens. The Chiefs defeated the Houston Texans 51–31 in the AFC Divisional Game after falling behind 24–0 at the start of the second quarter with Mahomes throwing for five touchdowns. The Chiefs hosted their second AFC Championship game in consecutive years facing the sixth-seed Tennessee Titans. The Chiefs then defeated the Titans 35–24 and advanced to Super Bowl LIV. This marked their first Super Bowl appearance in 50 years, since Super Bowl IV.

On February 2, 2020, in Hard Rock Stadium in Miami Gardens, Florida, the Chiefs played against the NFC's top seed, the San Francisco 49ers. Following halftime when both teams were tied at ten points, Mahomes threw 2 interceptions in back to back drives in the 3rd and 4th quarters, resulting in the 49ers having a 20–10 lead with under 12 minutes remaining in the game. The Chiefs scored touchdowns on their next two possessions, with Mahomes throwing touchdowns to Travis Kelce and Damien Williams. With a 24–20 lead with under two minutes remaining, Williams had a 38-yard touchdown run to effectively seal the game for the Chiefs. This marked the first time in NFL postseason history that a team faced ten point deficits in three straight games and won all three by double-digit margins. Mahomes won the Super Bowl Most Valuable Player Award, ending the Chiefs' Super Bowl drought dating back to the AFL-NFL Merger.

On July 6, 2020, Mahomes signed a record ten–year, $503 million contract extension keeping him under contract until the conclusion of the 2031 season. The contract is the largest ever signed in North American sports, more than tripling the value of the previous largest contract signed (although said contract was for a shorter 5 years, signed by Matt Ryan of the Atlanta Falcons). With their week 14 victory over the Miami Dolphins, the Chiefs clinched their fifth consecutive division title. The victory also gave the Chiefs their first 12–1 record in franchise history. They would later win 14 games for the first time in franchise history. In the playoffs they defeated the Cleveland Browns and Buffalo Bills to win the AFC Championship for the second consecutive year. The Chiefs would face the Tampa Bay Buccaneers in Super Bowl LV at Raymond James Stadium in Tampa, ultimately losing 9–31, failing to score a touchdown in the game. On December 26, 2021, the Chiefs beat the Pittsburgh Steelers 36–10, earning the team's sixth straight AFC West title.

The Chiefs began their playoff slate with a win against the Pittsburgh Steelers in the Wild Card round, and advanced to play the Buffalo Bills in the Divisional Round. Their 42–36 victory over Buffalo came in a game sports commentators and analysts dubbed as one of the greatest modern day NFL playoff games. Despite being the first team to host the AFC Championship game for four consecutive seasons, the team finished the season losing 24–27 in overtime to the Cincinnati Bengals.

The Chiefs began their 2022 season by trading Tyreek Hill to the Miami Dolphins, and instead opting to stock up on picks in the 2022 NFL Draft. The finished the season with a 14–3 regular season record, with losses coming from the Colts, Bills, and Bengals.  All three losses were by margins of less than four points. The Chiefs won their seventh consecutive AFC West division championship, and secured the #1 seed in the AFC playoffs. The team hosted their fifth consecutive AFC Championship Game, and second consecutive against the Cincinnati Bengals, winning 23–20 on a game-winning field goal from Harrison Butker.  In Super Bowl LVII, the Chiefs defeated the Philadelphia Eagles 38–35 again on a field goal from Butker. With the victory, Mahomes became the first player since Kurt Warner in 1999 to win both the NFL MVP Award and Super Bowl MVP Award in the same season. Head coach Andy Reid won his second Super Bowl championship over the Eagles, the team he had previously led to a Super Bowl appearance.

Championships
The Chiefs have won three Super Bowl Championships and three AFL Championships – the latter of which were won twice as the Kansas City Chiefs and once under their original name, the Dallas Texans.

Super Bowl Championships

American Football League Championships

American Football Conference Championships

Logos and uniforms

When the Texans began playing in 1960, the team's logo consisted of the state of Texas in white with a yellow star marking the location of the city of Dallas. Originally, Hunt chose Columbia blue and orange for the Texans' uniforms, but Bud Adams chose Columbia blue and scarlet for his Houston Oilers franchise. Hunt reverted to red and gold for the Texans' uniforms, which even after the team relocated to Kansas City, remain as the franchise's colors to this day.

The state of Texas on the team's helmet was replaced by an arrowhead design originally sketched by Lamar Hunt on a napkin. Hunt's inspiration for the interlocking "KC" design was the "SF" inside of an oval on the San Francisco 49ers helmets. Unlike the 49ers' logo, Kansas City's overlapping initials appear inside a white arrowhead instead of an oval and are surrounded by a thin black outline. From 1960 to 1973, the Chiefs had grey facemask bars on their helmets, but changed to white facemasks in 1974, making them one of the first teams (alongside the San Diego Chargers, who introduced a yellow facemask that same year) in the NFL to use a non-gray facemask.

The Chiefs' uniform design has essentially remained the same throughout the club's history. It consists of a red helmet, and either red or white jerseys with the opposite color numbers and names. White pants were used with both jerseys from 1960 to 1967, and 1989 to 1999. Beginning in 2009, during the Pioli/Haley era, the team has alternated between white and red pants for road games during the season. Prior to September 15, 2013, the Chiefs always wore white pants with their red jerseys. The Chiefs do not have an official alternate jersey, although unofficial alternate jerseys are sold for retail.

The Chiefs wore their white jerseys with white pants at home for the 2006 season opener against the Cincinnati Bengals. The logic behind the uniform selection that day was that the Bengals would have to wear their black uniform on a day when hot temperatures were forecast. The only other time the Chiefs wore white at home was throughout the 1980 season under Marv Levy.

In 2007, the Kansas City Chiefs honored Lamar Hunt and the AFL with a special patch. It features the AFL's logo from the 1960s with Hunt's "LH" initials inside the football. In 2008, the patch became permanently affixed to the left chest of both Kansas City's home and away jerseys.

In select games for the 2009 season, the Chiefs, as well as the other founding teams of the American Football League, wore a "throwback" uniform to celebrate the AFL's 50th anniversary.

For the first time in team history, the Chiefs wore red jerseys with red pants, forming an all-red combo in their home opener against the Dallas Cowboys on September 15, 2013. The all-red uniform is now an official uniform combination and has been used multiple times since. It is commonly used for prime-time games at home. The all-red look also served as the basis for the Chiefs' Color Rush design.

Arrowhead Stadium

Arrowhead Stadium has been the Chiefs' home field since 1972 and has a capacity of 76,416, which makes it the fifth-largest stadium in the NFL. The stadium underwent a $375 million renovation, completed in mid-2010, which included new luxury boxes, wider concourses and enhanced amenities. The stadium renovation was paid for by $250 million in taxpayer money and $125 million from the Hunt Family. The stadium cost $53 million to build in 1972, and an average ticket in 2009 costs $81. Aramark serves as the stadium's concession provider and T-Mobile, Anheuser-Busch and Coca-Cola are major corporate sponsors.

Dating back to the Chiefs' home opener in 1991 to mid-2009, the Chiefs had 155 consecutive sellout games. The streak ended with the final home game of the 2009 season against the Cleveland Browns, resulting in the first local TV blackout in over 19 years. Arrowhead has been called one of the world's finest stadiums and has long held a reputation for being one of the toughest and loudest outdoor stadiums for opposing players to play in. All noise is directly attributed to its fans and was once measured at 116 decibels by the Acoustical Design Group of Mission, Kansas. By way of comparison, take-off of aircraft may lead to a sound level of 106 decibels at the ground. Sports Illustrated named Arrowhead Stadium the "toughest place to play" for opposing teams in 2005. The tailgate party environment outside the stadium on gameday has been compared to a "college football" atmosphere. Arrowhead Stadium features frequent fly-overs from a B-2 Spirit stealth bomber from nearby Whiteman Air Force Base. Since the 1994 NFL season, the stadium has had a natural grass playing surface. From 1972 to 1993, the stadium had an artificial AstroTurf surface.

During the game against the Oakland Raiders on October 13, 2013, Arrowhead Stadium once again became the loudest stadium in the world when the fans set the Guinness Book of World Records record for loudest crowd in an outdoor stadium (137.5 dB), breaking the record set by the Seattle Seahawks just four weeks prior. A few weeks after, Seattle re-gained the record by reaching a noise level of 137.6 decibels. Chiefs fans have reclaimed the record once again on September 29, 2014, on ESPN's Monday Night Football against the New England Patriots, the fans recorded a sound reading of 142.2 decibels.

The stadium has been officially named GEHA Field at Arrowhead Stadium (pronounced G.E.H.A.) since 2021. The stadium was renamed after GEHA signed a naming rights deal with the Chiefs.

Training camp and practice facility

When the franchise was based in Dallas, the team conducted their inaugural training camp at the New Mexico Military Institute in Roswell, New Mexico. They moved camp to Southern Methodist University, owner Lamar Hunt's alma mater, for 1961 and continued to practice there until 1965. From 1966 to 1971, the Chiefs practiced in Swope Park in Kansas City, and from 1972 to 1991 held camp at William Jewell College in Clay County, Missouri–where Lamar Hunt had extensive business dealings including Worlds of Fun, Oceans of Fun and SubTropolis.

From 1992 to 2009 the Chiefs conducted summer training camp at the University of Wisconsin–River Falls in River Falls, Wisconsin. The Chiefs' 2007 training camp was documented in the HBO/NFL Films documentary reality television series, Hard Knocks. Following the passage of a $25 million state tax credit proposal, the Chiefs moved their training camp to Missouri Western State University in St. Joseph, Missouri, in 2010. The bulk of the tax credits went for improvements to Arrowhead Stadium with $10 million applied to the move to Missouri Western. A climate-controlled, 120-yard NFL regulation grass indoor field, and office space for the Chiefs was constructed at Missouri Western adjacent to the school's Spratt Stadium before the 2010 season.

Outside of training camp and during the regular season, the Chiefs conduct practices at their own training facility nearby Arrowhead Stadium. The facility is located near the Raytown Road entrance to the Truman Sports Complex just east of Interstate 435 and features three outdoor fields (two grass and one artificial turf) as well as an indoor facility with its own full-size field.

Rivalries

The Chiefs share intense rivalries with their three AFC West opponents, namely the Denver Broncos, Las Vegas Raiders, and Los Angeles Chargers, with the Raiders rivalry considered one of the most bitter in the NFL. In terms of NFC teams, the Chiefs formerly shared a cross-state rivalry with teams located across the state of Missouri in St. Louis, namely the Cardinals and Rams. An individual rivalry between quarterback Patrick Mahomes and Buffalo Bills quarterback Josh Allen has developed in recent years, with many comparing it to the former rivalry between Tom Brady and Peyton Manning. The Mahomes led Chiefs also developed a rivalry with the Joe Burrow led Cincinnati Bengals, with Burrow being the only AFC quarterback to date to hold a winning record against Mahomes.

Mascots and cheerleaders 

The Chiefs' first mascot was Warpaint, a nickname given to several breeds of pinto horse. Warpaint served as the team's mascot from 1963 to 1988. The first Warpaint (born in 1955, died in 1992) was ridden bareback by rider Bob Johnson who wore a full Native American headdress. Warpaint circled the field at the beginning of each Chiefs home game and performed victory laps following each Chiefs touchdown. On September 20, 2009, a new Warpaint horse was unveiled at the Chiefs' home opener. Warpaint was ridden by a cheerleader in its return. The Chiefs again retired Warpaint in 2021 as a part of their commitment to stop the use of Native American imagery.

In the mid-1980s, the Chiefs featured a short-lived unnamed "Indian man" mascot which was later scrapped in 1988. Since 1989 the cartoon-like K. C. Wolf, portrayed by Dan Meers in a wolf costume, has served as the team's mascot. The mascot was named after the Chiefs' "Wolfpack", a group of rabid fans from the team's days at Municipal Stadium. K. C. Wolf is one of the most popular NFL mascots and was the league's first mascot inducted into the Mascot Hall of Fame in 2006.

The Chiefs have employed a cheerleading squad since the team's inception in 1960. In the team's early days, the all-female squad was referred to as the Chiefettes. In addition to the Cheerleaders, in the early 1970s, there was also a dance/drill team that performed for pre-game and halftime. From 1986 to 1992, the cheerleader squad featured a mix of men and women. From 1993 to 2019, the all-female squad has been known as the Chiefs Cheerleaders, and in 2020, one male joined the team.

Notable players

Current roster

Retired numbers

Pro Football Hall of Famers
Twenty-four members of the Pro Football Hall of Fame spent at least some portion of their career with the Chiefs. Thirteen spent the majority of the career with the Chiefs. Ten of the Chiefs in the Hall of Fame were involved with the Chiefs during their Super Bowl Championship season of 1969. The Chiefs have 3 contributors, 3 coaches, and 18 players in the Hall of Fame. Derrick Thomas is the only Chief in the Hall of Fame that was inducted posthumously.

Chiefs Hall of Fame
Established in 1970, the Chiefs Hall of Fame has inducted a new member, with the exception of the 1983 and 2020 seasons, every year to honor their players, coaches, and contributors in an annual ceremony. Several of the names were featured at Arrowhead Stadium in the stadium's architecture prior to renovations in 2009. The requirements for induction are that a player, coach, or contributor must have been with the Chiefs for four seasons and been out of the NFL for four seasons at the time of induction. There are some exceptions, such as Joe Delaney and Derrick Thomas, Delaney was with the team for only two seasons before his death, Thomas was inducted 1 year after his death in January 2000 (2 years after his final season). The Chiefs have the second-most enshrinees of any NFL team in their team Hall of Fame behind the Green Bay Packers, who have enshrined over 100 players and team contributors over the years in the Green Bay Packers Hall of Fame. Nineteen players and the coach of the Super Bowl IV championship team have been inducted into the ring of honor. Three players were posthumously inducted, Derrick Thomas, Joe Delaney, and Mack Lee Hill.

Head coaches

Thirteen head coaches have served the Texans/Chiefs franchise since their first season in 1960. Hank Stram, the team's first head coach, led the Chiefs to three AFL championship victories and two appearances in the Super Bowl. Stram was the team's longest-tenured head coach, holding the position from 1960 to 1974. Marty Schottenheimer was hired in 1989 and led Kansas City to seven playoff appearances in his ten seasons as head coach. Schottenheimer had the best winning percentage (.634) of all Chiefs coaches. Gunther Cunningham was on the Chiefs' coaching staff in various positions from 1995 to 2008, serving as the team's head coach in between stints as the team's defensive coordinator. Dick Vermeil coached the team to a franchise-best 9–0 start in the 2003 season. Of the ten Chiefs coaches, Hank Stram, Marv Levy, and Dick Vermeil have been elected into the Pro Football Hall of Fame, Levy is more well known for his time with the Buffalo Bills. Herm Edwards served as the team's head coach from 2006 to 2008, compiling a 15–33 record and a franchise worst 6–26 record over a two-year span. Todd Haley compiled a 19–26 record with the team from 2009 to 2011, including an AFC West division title in 2010. Haley was fired with three games left in the 2011 season. Romeo Crennel was named interim coach, and was promoted to full-time coach in January 2012. Crennel was fired on Monday, December 31, 2012, after finishing the 2012 season with a 2–14 record. On January 5, 2013, the Chiefs hired Andy Reid to be their next head coach. In Reid's tenure, the Chiefs have never had a sub-.500 season, making the playoffs in 8 of his 9 seasons as head coach, winning the division six times, and two consecutive Super Bowl appearances.

Ownership and administration

The franchise was founded in 1959 by Lamar Hunt after a failed attempt by Hunt to purchase an NFL franchise and relocate them to Texas.  Hunt remained the team's owner until his death in 2006. The Hunt family kept ownership of the team following Lamar's death and Clark Hunt, Lamar's son, represents the family's interests. While Hunt's official title is CEO and Chairman of the Board, he represents the team at all owner meetings. In 2010, Hunt assumed role as CEO alongside his role as chairman of the board. According to Forbes, the team entered the 2022 season valued at $3.7 billion ranking them 23rd among the 32 NFL teams.

Owner Lamar Hunt served as the team's president from 1960 to 1976. Because of Lamar Hunt's contributions to the NFL, the AFC Championship trophy is named after him. He promoted general manager Jack Steadman to become the team's president in 1977. Steadman held the job until Carl Peterson was hired by Hunt in 1988 to replace him. Peterson resigned the title as team president in 2008. Denny Thum became the team's interim president following Peterson's departure and was officially given the full position in May 2009. Thum resigned from his position on September 14, 2010.

Don Rossi served as the team's general manager for half of the 1960 season, resigning in November 1960. Jack Steadman assumed duties from Rossi and served in the position until 1976. Steadman was promoted to team president in 1976 and despite being relieved of those duties in 1988, he remained with the franchise until 2006 in various positions. Jim Schaaf took over for Steadman as general manager until being fired in December 1988. Carl Peterson was hired in 1988 to serve as the team's general manager, chief executive officer and team president. Peterson remained in the position for nineteen years until he announced his resignation from the team in 2008. Denny Thum served as interim general manager until January 13, 2009, when the Chiefs named New England Patriots executive Scott Pioli the team's new general manager.
Pioli was released in early January after the hiring of Andy Reid, and was replaced by John Dorsey. Pioli's record as the Chief's general manager was 23–41.

On June 22, 2017, the Chiefs fired Dorsey. They hired Brett Veach as the new general manager on July 10, 2017.

Staff

Media

Audacy, Inc.'s WDAF-FM (106.5) is the flagship station for The Chiefs Football Radio Network. The network has affiliates across Missouri, Kansas, Iowa, Nebraska, and Texas, and national reach through desktop and mobile devices. Currently, NBC affiliate KSHB-TV (channel 41) serves as the team's official station for broadcasting surrounding team programming.

Culture

Fan base

The Chiefs boast one of the most loyal fan bases in the NFL. Kansas City is the sixth-smallest media market with an NFL team, but they have had the second-highest attendance average over the last decade. Studies by Bizjournals in 2006 gave the Chiefs high marks for consistently drawing capacity crowds in both good seasons and bad. The Chiefs averaged 77,300 fans per game from 1996 to 2006, second in the NFL behind the Washington Redskins. The franchise has an official fan club called Chiefs Kingdom which gives members opportunities to ticket priority benefits and VIP treatment.

At the end of "The Star-Spangled Banner" before home games, many Chiefs fans intentionally yell out "CHIEFS!" rather than singing "brave" as the final word. This can also occasionally be heard in road games and even at sporting events for the nearby University of Kansas. In 1996, general manager Carl Peterson said "We all look forward, not only at Arrowhead, but on the road, too, to when we get to that stanza of the National Anthem... Our players love it." After the September 11, 2001 attacks, Chiefs fans refrained from doing so in honor of those who lost their lives in the tragedy and continued to do so for the remainder of the 2001 season. At the Chiefs' September 23, 2001, home game against the New York Giants, fans gave the opposing Giants a standing ovation.

After every Chiefs touchdown at home games, fans chaned while pointing in the direction of the visiting team and fans, "We're gonna beat the hell outta you...you...you, you, you, you!" over the song "Rock and Roll Part 2". The chant starts after the third "hey!" in the song. The original version of the song by Gary Glitter was previously used until the NFL banned his music from its facilities in 2006 following the British rocker's conviction on sexual abuse charges in Vietnam. A cover version of the song played by Tube Tops 2000 was used from 2006 until the 2015 season. The practice was later completely discontinued prior to the 2015 season after Glitter was arrested again. The team would eventually adopt Beastie Boys' "(You Gotta) Fight for Your Right (To Party!)" after Travis Kelce shouted the main chorus while celebrating victories in the AFC Championship Game and Super Bowl.

Notable fans include Brad Pitt, Paul Rudd, Jason Sudeikis, Henry Cavill, David Koechner, Rob Riggle, Heidi Gardner, John Amos, Melissa Etheridge, and Eric Stonestreet.

Arrowhead Stadium is also recognized by Guinness World Records as having the loudest outdoor stadium in the world. This was achieved on September 29, 2014, in a Monday Night Football game against the New England Patriots when the crowd achieved a roar of 142.2 decibels which is comparable to standing  from a jet engine, which even with short term exposure, can cause permanent damage.

International outreach

The NFL introduced the league's international home marketing area program in 2021, which sees teams secure international marketing rights in countries beyond the United States. The Chiefs were designated as a home team to Germany alongside the Carolina Panthers, New England Patriots, and Tampa Bay Buccaneers. The Chiefs will host a game in Germany during their 2023 season.

The Chiefs have played international regular season games against Detroit in 2015 in London, and against the LA Chargers in 2019 in Mexico City. The team participated in preseason exhibition games dubbed the American Bowl in Berlin (1990), Tokyo (1994 and 1998), and Monterrey, Mexico (1996).

The Chiefs' fan base has expanded across the world like many other NFL teams. A Twitter account is dedicated to Chiefs fans in the UK and has been recognized by the Kansas City Chiefs and is their official UK fan page. They have many dedicated fans writing articles and interviewing players of the team such as Tamba Hali.

Tony DiPardo
From various periods between 1963 and the 2008 season, trumpeter Tony DiPardo and The T.D. Pack Band played live music at every Chiefs home game. The band was known as The Zing Band when the team was located at Municipal Stadium. DiPardo was honored by head coach Hank Stram in 1969 with a Super Bowl ring for the team's victory in Super Bowl IV. When his health was declining, DiPardo took a leave of absence from the band from 1983 to 1988. DiPardo's daughter took over as bandleader in 1989, by which time DiPardo returned to the band by popular demand. For the 2009 season, due to renovations at Arrowhead Stadium, the band did not return to perform at the stadium.

DiPardo died on January 27, 2011, at age 98. He had been hospitalized since December 2010 after suffering a brain aneurysm.

Name controversy 

For various reasons, the team has faced charges of racism and anti-Indigenous cultural appropriation and misuse of names, symbols, and practices. The name comes from the nickname of former Kansas City mayor Harold Roe Bartle, who nicknamed himself "Chief" as part of creating the Tribe of Mic-O-Say, a group affiliated with the Boy Scouts of America that uses fake Native American imagery, stories, and made-up ceremonies where its participants "play Indian." Over the life of the franchise the following have also been displayed: an arrowhead logo, fans' "tomahawk chop" gestures during games, a horse named Warpaint, the use of a large drum, and the wearing of face paint, headdresses, and other Native American symbols.

Chiefs fans also carry on a tradition that began at Florida State University in the mid 1980s by using the Seminole WarChant as a rallying cry during key moments in their football games. Prior to each home game, a former Chiefs player or a famous Chiefs fan (such as NASCAR driver Clint Bowyer or rapper Tech N9ne), called the honorary drum leader, bangs on a drum with a large drum stick to start the Tomahawk chop.

The Chiefs' and their fans' use of American Indian imagery and stereotypes has been the source of controversy, as some decry usage of symbols like the "war drum," songs and spectacles like the "Tomahawk Chop," and stereotypical dress of fans in faux war paint and headdresses.  In 2016, Native American groups asked the Kansas City Chiefs to stop doing the tomahawk chop. In the same year a similar request was made of Exeter Chiefs.  The editorial board of the Kansas City Star newspaper called for the cessation of the "Tomahawk Chop" in late 2019, noting opposition from Native Americans and Tribes, and stating that the practice stereotypes and dehumanizes Native Americans. The National Congress of American Indians and the Kansas City Indian Center have called for the mascot to be retired.

The Chiefs have escaped the more intense criticism of other teams, such as the Washington Redskins and Cleveland Indians who changed their names beginning with their 2022 seasons, for using Native American names and logos. Attention increased in 2020 in advance of their appearance in Super Bowl LIV. While there have been efforts to address other issues, such as fans wearing warpaint and headdresses, the tomahawk chop and the accompanying chant is defended, including by some local Native Americans. In a national survey, half of Native Americans said the "tomahawk chop" bothered or offended them, rising to 65% among those more engaged in Native traditions.

See also
 List of Kansas City Chiefs seasons
 Sports in Kansas City

References

Further reading

External links

 
 Kansas City Chiefs at the National Football League official website

 
Dallas Texans
American Football League teams
National Football League teams
American football teams in Kansas City, Missouri
Sports in the Kansas City metropolitan area
American football teams established in 1960
1963 establishments in Missouri
Sports teams in the Kansas City metropolitan area